Jyotipur is a village located in Champua Block of Kendujhar district in Odisha. The village has a population of 1,794 of which 871 are males while 923 are females as per the Population Census 2011. Bhanda, Kashipal, Budhikapudi, Turumunga are nearby villages to Jyotipur. The PIN code of Jyotipur is 758046.

References

Villages in Kendujhar district